José Sánchez Guerra y Martinez (28 June 1859, in Córdoba – 26 January 1935, in Madrid) was a Spanish journalist, lawyer and Prime Minister. His term as Prime Minister lasted from 8 March to 7 December 1922. He was a Conservative who has been described as "courageous" and "politically mediocre."

Biography
He began his political career in 1886 when he obtained a certificate of election in Cabra (Córdoba) for the Liberal Party. Sagasta won this seat in the constituency of Córdoba on behalf of the Liberals in successive elections until 1901. In 1902, along with Antonio Maura, he went over to the Conservative Party. He continued to receive the certificate of election for Cordoba in consecutive elections until 1918. His brother Antonio Barroso Castillo also contested elections in the province.

He was Minister of the Interior between 5 December 1903 and 5 December 1904 in the Maura government. He again occupied the same ministerial portfolio for two terms under Dato's governments: between 27 October 1913 and 9 December 1915, and between 11 June and 3 November 1917. He was also Minister of Promotion between 14 September 1908 and 21 October 1909, again under the presidency of Eduardo Dato, and Minister of War between 15 July and 7 December 1922 in the Sánchez Guerra cabinet.

References

External links
 

Spanish journalists
19th-century Spanish lawyers
Prime Ministers of Spain
1859 births
1935 deaths
Presidents of the Congress of Deputies (Spain)
Conservative Party (Spain) politicians
Governors of the Bank of Spain
Interior ministers of Spain
Civil governors of Madrid
Exiled Spanish politicians